Anders Wrethov, professionally known as Anderz Wrethov, is a Swedish songwriter and producer.

Biography 
Wrethov was born in Trelleborg and grew up in Vellinge. He graduated from Musikhögskolan in Malmö in 2002. He sings and plays the piano and the guitar.

He began learning to play the guitar at the age of seven, and also took piano lessons. In the 1980s he started listening to hard rock music, and playing the electric guitar.

Since graduating from Musikhögskolan, where he studied guitar, piano and song, he has worked as a producer and songwriter.

Career
Wrethov has worked with a number of artists in Sweden and abroad; he and his sister Elin were part of the songwriting team for the song Always, the Azerbaijani entry to the Eurovision Song Contest 2009. He has also co-written and produced songs for Melodifestivalen, the Swedish qualifying contest for the Eurovision Song Contest, several times. In 2019 he co-wrote four of the entries, including the winning song, "Too Late For Love". In 2021, he was part of the team that wrote and produced the song "Voices", which won the Melodifestivalen in that year. He also wrote the official song for the Swedish football team for the FIFA Women's World Cup in 2011.

In 2011, Wrethov released his first single and made his debut as a singer.

References

External links
 Official website

Swedish pop singers
Swedish record producers
Living people
21st-century Swedish singers
21st-century Swedish male singers
Year of birth missing (living people)